Beuvraignes is a commune in the Somme department in Hauts-de-France in northern France.

Geography
Of linear growth, the town sits between Tilloloy, on the other side of the N17, the A1 autoroute and the TGV railway line and, on the other side, by Crapeaumesnil.

Bounded by 10 other commune territories (four belong to the Somme department and six to the Oise), the population is divided up between the principal town and three hamlets, l’Abbaye, Cessier and Loges. The terrain around Beuvraignes forms a gently-rippled plateau limited by the valley of the Matz.

Etymology of the name of the commune
Beverinae (1048), Bevrigne (1148), Buvrigne (1184), Buveringnes (1300), Buvregnes (1362), Buveraines (1564), Buvringe (1625), Buverainge (1666), Beuvreines (1743), Beuvraignes (1767)

History
Different discoveries of the 19th century proved the Gallo-Roman origins of the town. Finds include pottery kilns and effigies of Nero and Posthumous. At this time, the territory was  populated by the Veromandues, a Gallic tribe of Belgian origin, who lived in an environment of woodland and marshes.
In the 13th century, Beuvraignes appears in the archives of the abbey of St. Eloi of Noyon, under which control it remained until the 18th century. Most people were peasant farmers paying dues to the abbey. Life was hard during the medieval period in the north of France, in between famines and the invasions of the English, Burgundians and the Spanish.
Things changed little during the French Revolution for the peasants. The church was requisitioned and transformed into a gunpowder factory. The locals pleaded for their lord of the manor of Tilloloy, but he was guillotined under The Terror.

The 19th century was more kind to the people of the territory. Economic development and abundant harvests, the building of the castle at Loges (home to the baron of Septenville in 1798), the hiring of 2 teachers (rare in a rural environment under the Empire), installation of paving and a square for the town centre, a new chapel in 1867, the creation of the railway line between Roye and Compiègne, with a train station in the town (1879) and finally, the inauguration of a telegraph office in May 1900.

World War I broke the momentum, as, early in 1915, the town was razed and reduced to ashes. In 1919 when the first inhabitants returned, they discovered the town was more like a lunar landscape. It took 10 years to recover the fertility of the land and for the trees to flower and fruit again. Each year, farmers still find military traces of that terrible war.
During World War II, the town was under Nazi occupation and classified as the forbidden zone.  Beuvraignes had two prisoner-of-war camps. Some inhabitants were arrested and never returned from the Nazi camps.

Nowadays, the town’s economy consists of a bakers, a horticulturist, two plumbers, a mattress maker, a glass-fibre factory) and several other businesses.

Monuments
 Beuvraignes military cemetery

Population

See also
Communes of the Somme department

References

Communes of Somme (department)